Alliance française or AF (The French Alliance) is an international organization that aims to promote the French language and francophone culture around the world. Created in Paris on 21 July 1883 under the name Alliance française pour la propagation de la langue nationale dans les colonies et à l'étranger (French alliance for the propagation of the national language in the colonies and abroad), known now simply as L'Alliance française, its primary goal is teaching French as a second language. Headquartered in Paris, the Alliance had 850 centers in 137 countries on every inhabited continent in 2014.

History and role

The Alliance was created in Paris on 21 July 1883 by a group including the scientist Louis Pasteur, the diplomat Ferdinand de Lesseps, the writers Jules Verne and Ernest Renan, and the publisher Armand Colin.

It finances most of its activities from the fees it receives from its courses and from rental of its installations. The French government also provides a subsidy covering approximately five percent of its budget (nearly 665,000 € in 2003)

More than 440,000 students learn French at one of the centres run by the Alliance, whose network of schools includes:
 a centre in Paris, Alliance française Paris Île-de-France
 locations throughout France for foreign students and
 1,016 locations in 135 countries.

The organizations outside Paris are local, independently run franchises. Each has a committee and a president. The Alliance française brand is owned by the Paris centre. In many countries, the Alliance française of Paris is represented by a Délégué général. The French Government also runs 150 separate French Cultural Institutes that exist to promote French language and culture.

The Alliances organize social and cultural events, such as art exhibitions, movie festivals, social gatherings, book clubs.

By country

France
Fondation Alliance française

Paris

Alliance française Paris Île-de-France

The Alliance française Paris Ile-de-France is a Higher Private Education Institute. It is an association from the law 1901.
Located in the heart of the capital, the Alliance française Paris Île-de-France is a genuine international meeting point where more than 11,000 students from 160 different countries come every year to learn French. It is also the oldest one since the school offers courses in Paris since 1894.

Until 2007, the year of creation of the Alliance française Foundation, the Alliance française Paris Île-de-France was called "the Paris Alliance française".

It was divided into three branches: the International Relations (DRI), the School of Paris, and the Department of Human and Financial Resources (DRHF). In 2007, the DRI has become the Alliance française Foundation, while the School and the DRHF became the Alliance française Paris Île-de-France.

Three conventions are now governing the relations between the Foundation and the Alliance française Paris Île-de-France:
 a financial agreement: the Alliance française Paris Ile-de-France supports the Foundation financially.
 an agreement for the premises: the Paris Alliance française donated its building in Boulevard Raspail to the Foundation at the time of the division in 2007
 a teaching agreement: the Alliance française Paris Ile-de-France supports the Alliances françaises worldwide in their projects to professionalize their teaching and administrative staff. More than 40 missions per year are made abroad.

The Alliance française Paris Ile-de-France works with Alliances françaises from around the world, ministries, public bodies, and also large companies, supporting them in their desire to improve their command of the language in a professional environment.

Montpellier

Alliance française Montpellier is a French language school in the south of France, a private higher education institution providing French courses for foreigners (FLE) and a non-profit association, established in accordance with the statutes and objectives of the Alliance française Foundation. This study centre is part of the network of Alliances françaises de France.

Africa

 Botswana 1
 Comoros 3
 Eritrea 1
 Ethiopia 2 (Addis Ababa and Dire Dawa)
 Ghana 4
 Kenya 4 (Nairobi, Mombasa, Eldoret, and Kisumu)
 Lesotho 1
 Madagascar 29
 Mauritius 6
 Mozambique 1
 Namibia 1
 Nigeria 10 (Alliance française de Port Harcourt, Alliance française de Lagos )
 Southern Africa 13 (Alliance française of Port Elizabeth)
 Swaziland 1
 Tanzania
 Uganda 1
 Zambia
 Zimbabwe 1

Americas

 Argentina there are 72 partnerships with 16,000 students forming a network is considered one of the largest and oldest in the world. In Rosario, Buenos Aires, Córdoba, Campana, Santa Fe, Mendoza.
 Bermuda has one Alliance française.
 Bolivia has five Alliances françaises in all the main centers of population: Cochabamba, La Paz, Santa Cruz de la Sierra, Sucre, Tarija.
 Brazil There are 39 Alliance française schools in Brazil, and six partner learning centres. Out of the federation's 26 states, only seven have no schools or learning centres. Alliance française has been in the Brazilian educational scenario for more than 130 years, since 1885.
 Canada has 13 Alliances françaises in nine cities from coast to coast: Victoria, Vancouver, Calgary, Edmonton, Winnipeg, Toronto (five campuses, located in Spadina, North York, Markham, Mississauga, and Oakville), Ottawa, Moncton, and Halifax.
 Chile has six Alliances françaises in six cities in Santiago, Viña del Mar, Concepción, Curicó, Antofagasta and Osorno.
 Colombia has more than 20 Alliances françaises in 16 cities.
 Costa Rica has three Alliances françaises, the first in Barrio Amón, in the East side of the capital San José and another two, one in La Sabana (West side of the capital) and also in Heredia, another province of Costa Rica.
 Cuba has three Alliances françaises, one located in Santiago de Cuba and the other two in Havana City.
 Dominica has one Alliance française, in the capital city, Roseau.
 Dominican Republic has 4 Alliance françaises, one in the capital city, Santo Domingo, and others in Santiago, Mao and Monte Cristi.
 Ecuador has five Alliances françaises, located in the capital city of Quito and in the cities of: Cuenca, Guayaquil, Loja and Portoviejo.
 Alliance française in Quito was founded in 1953 and is the oldest of the five Alliances in Ecuador.
 El Salvador has one Alliance française Centre in the capital city, San Salvador.
 Grenada has one Alliance française in Saint George's
 Guatemala has one Alliance française, located in zone 13 of the capital, Guatemala City.
 Haiti has five Alliances françaises organizations.
 Honduras has two Alliances françaises, one located in Tegucigalpa and the other in San Pedro Sula.
 Jamaica has one Alliance française Centre in Kingston
 Mexico has 38 Alliances françaises organizations throughout the country and twelve affiliated centers. It has one of the first franchise in America, the Alliance Française de México
 Nicaragua has three Alliances françaises Centre, in the capital city, Managua and others in León and Granada
 Panama has one Alliance française organization.
 Paraguay has one Alliance française organization in Asunción.
 Peru has twelve Alliances françaises organizations, six in the capital city, Lima and others in Trujillo, Arequipa, Cusco, Piura, Huancayo and Iquitos.
 Puerto Rico has one Alliance française, located in the capital city of San Juan.
 Saint Lucia has one Alliance française, located in the capital city of Castries.
 Trinidad and Tobago has one main centre located in the capital city, Port of Spain, with additional classes on offer in San Fernando and Tobago.
 The United States has 110 chapters in 45 states, including French Institute Alliance Française in New York, Alliance française de Washington , Alliance française de Chicago, Alliance française de San Francisco, Alliance Francaise San Diego and Alliance Française Silicon Valley.
 Uruguay has one Alliance française, located in the capital city, Montevideo
 Venezuela has twelve Alliances françaises, five in the capital city Caracas, and in several others states.

Asia and Oceania

 Australia has 31 Alliances françaises organizations.
 Bangladesh has two Alliances françaises organizations, in Dhaka (Alliance française de Dhaka, two branches located in Dhanmondi and Gulshan) and in Chittagong.
 Brunei Darussalam
 Cambodia has one Alliance française, located in Siem Reap.
 China has fifteen Alliances françaises organizations: Beijing, Shanghai, Guangzhou, Dalian, Tianjin, Qingdao, Jinan, Chengdu, Wuhan, Chongqing, Hangzhou, Xian, and Nanjing.
 Hong Kong has three Alliances françaises centres, one in Wanchai, one in Jordan and another one in Shatin. Alliance française de Hong Kong was created in 1953.
 India has 24 Alliances françaises located in Ahmedabad, Bangalore, Bhopal, Chandigarh, Chennai (Alliance française de Madras), Coimbatore, Goa, Gurgaon, Hyderabad, Indore, Jaipur, Karikal, Kolkata, Madurai, Mahé, Mumbai, New Delhi, Nashik, Pondicherry, Pune, Mysore, Tiruchirappalli, Trivandrum, Vadodara.
 Indonesia has four Alliancess françaises located in Medan, Balikpapan, Semarang and Denpasar.
 Kazakhstan has two Alliances françaises located in Nur-Sultan and Almaty.
 Kyrgyzstan has one Alliance française, located in Bishkek.
 Macau
 Malaysia has three Alliances françaises centres, with two of them in Kuala Lumpur and another in George Town, Penang.
 Maldives has one center in capital city Malé.
 Mongolia
 Nepal has one centre in Kathmandu. 
 New Zealand has three Alliances françaises organizations. The Alliance française d'Auckland has 900 members.
 Pakistan has four Alliance françaises located in Karachi (Alliance française de Karachi), Lahore, Faisalabad and Islamabad.
 The Philippines has Alliance française de Cebu located in Cebu City, and Alliance française de Manille located in Makati City.
 Singapore has an Alliance française located in Newton.
 South Korea has seven Alliances françaises organizations: Seoul, Incheon, Daejeon, Jeonju, Gwangju, Daegu, and Busan.
 Sri Lanka has Alliance française de Kotte located in Colombo, and Alliance française de Kandy in Kandy.
 Taiwan has two Alliances françaises centres in Taipei and Kaohsiung.
 Thailand has its main centre in Bangkok and branches in Chiang Mai, Chiang Rai, and in the city of Phuket.
 Uzbekistan has an Alliance française located in capital, Tashkent.
 Vietnam has an Alliance française located near the Sword Lake, the focal point of central Hanoi.
United Arab Emirates has three Alliance française centres in Abu Dhabi city, Khalifa city and Dubai.

Europe

 Albania has five Alliance française organization located in Durrës, Elbasan, Korça, Shkodra and Tirana.
 Armenia has one Alliance française organization located in Yerevan, the capital of Armenia.
 Belgium has one Alliance française organization located in the capital Brussels.
 Croatia has five Alliances françaises organizations located in Dubrovnik, Osijek, Rijeka, Split, and Zagreb, the capital of Croatia.
 Hungary has five Alliances françaises organizations located in Debrecen, Győr, Miskolc, Pécs and Szeged.
 Iceland has one Alliance française organization located in Reykjavik.
 Ireland has six Alliances françaises organizations. Dublin, the capital of Ireland, is home to the third largest Alliance in Europe. There is also a location in Cork, Ireland's second city. Other locations in Ireland include Galway, Kilkenny, Limerick, and Waterford, which also has a branch in Wexford. Alliance française de Cork also organises the Cork French Film Festival.
 Italy has thirty-seven Alliances françaises organizations located throughout the country.
 Malta has one Alliance francaise organization located in Floriana.
 Moldova has one Alliance française organization located in Chişinău, the capital of Moldova.
 Monaco has one Alliance française organization located in the Principality, at the Embassy of France in Monaco.
 Romania has four Alliances françaises organizations located in Braşov, Constanţa, Piteşti and Ploieşti.
 Russia has thirteen offices - in Yekaterinburg, Irkutsk, Kazan, Nizhny Novgorod, Novosibirsk, Perm, Rostov-on-Don, Samara, Saratov, Tolyatti, Vladivostok, Ufa, and Ulyanovsk.
 Spain has twenty Alliances françaises organizations located all over the country, promoted by the Cultural Services of the French Embassy in Spain.
Sweden has 17 Alliances françaises organizations throughout the country. The oldest Swedish organization was established in 1889 in Stockholm.
 Turkey has one Alliance française organization located in Adana.
 The United Kingdom has eleven Alliances françaises organizations. The first Alliance française organization in the UK was located in London, which traces its roots back to 1884. Other locations in the British Isles include Bristol-Bath, Cambridge, Exeter, Glasgow, Jersey, Manchester, Milton Keynes, Newcastle-upon-tyne, Oxford and York. During WWII, the London location served as the international headquarters of Alliance française when the Paris location was closed.
The Netherlands counts 32 Alliances Françaises, the main one being located in The Hague, followed by 3 major other one in Amsterdam, Rotterdam and Utrecht. This network is very dynamic and powerful.

See also 
 Institut Français
 Cultural diplomacy
 Public diplomacy
 British Council
 Goethe-Institut
Instituto Cervantes

Notes

References

Further reading
 Bruézière, Maurice (author) L'Alliance française. Histoire d'une institution 1883-1983, 1983 Librairie Hachette, Paris. .
 Ürményházi, Attila J.(author) Un Centenaire de Rayonnement de la Culture Française (the abridged version of the AF's history to include Une Célébration de l'Alliance Française en Tasmanie), 2004. National Library of Australia, Canberra (Australian Collection) Np 943.9052 U77.

External links

 
 Alliance Française Montpellier Website

Organizations established in 1883
Franchises
Cultural centers
 
1883 establishments in France
French-language education
Cultural promotion organizations